Simon Nicholas Neal (born 2 January 1972) is a former English cricketer. Neal was a right-handed batsman who bowled right-arm medium pace and who occasionally played as a wicketkeeper. He was born in Nottingham, Nottinghamshire.

Neal represented the Nottinghamshire Cricket Board in a single List A match against Scotland in the 1st round of the 1999 NatWest Trophy. In his only List A match he scored 7 runs.

References

External links
Simon Neal at Cricinfo
Simon Neal at CricketArchive

1972 births
Living people
Cricketers from Nottingham
English cricketers
Nottinghamshire Cricket Board cricketers